Jeon Yun-su (born March 5, 1971, in Seoul) is a South Korean film director and scriptwriter.

Filmography
As director:
 Summer Snow (2015)
 Portrait of a Beauty (2008)
 Le Grand Chef (2007)
 My Girl and I (2005)
 Kiss Me Much (2001)

External links
 
 
 
 Jeon Yun-su at Korean Film Biz Zone

South Korean film directors
South Korean screenwriters
1971 births
Living people